Trinidad, Kimsantin  officially La Santísima Trinidad (Spanish, 'The Most Holy Trinity'), is a city in Bolivia, capital of the department of Beni.  The population is 130,000 (2010 official estimate). While historically a peripheral city in Bolivia, Trinidad is today an important center for the Bolivian Bovine industry and has enjoyed a modest economic boom in recent years and enjoys an HDI index of above 0.700. 

While technically on the periphery of the Amazon rainforest, Trinidad is a wet monsoonal location that is connected by the Mamoré river to the greater Amazon Basin. While wet enough to be a rainforest in total annual precipitation, dry monsoonal weather separates the year into dry and wet seasons as is common throughout much of the greater Amazon basin, particularly to the southeast.

Trinidad is a growing city of medium size, and while not an important national center, has grown in importance for the local economy of the Bolivian orient north of Santa Cruz de la Sierra.

The city is also home to the Bolivian Navy flotilla.

History
The city was founded in 1686 by Father Cipriano Barace. In 1769 the town moved to its current location, 9 miles away, due to flooding. The original city was on the Mamoré River, but flooding and disease forced a move on the location of the city. It is located in the province of Cercado, one of Beni’s eight provinces.

Languages
Camba Spanish is the primary vernacular lingua franca spoken in the town. Trinitário, a Moxo dialect, is the main indigenous language spoken.

Infrastructure
One of the more notable features of the city is the open drains that surrounds every block of buildings.  These are linked together by lidded ditches and thence to the local river. These are necessary due to the heavy rainfall that occurs between December and May.

Tourism

The city is surrounded by rivers, lakes and lagoons. There are many river tours and restaurants and resorts around the city’s main lagoons. Trinidad is also one of the first five Jesuit mission towns established and these are now part of the Misiones tour includes visits to San Javier, Loreto, San Pedro and San Ignacio de Moxos as well. Trinidad and San Ignacio de Moxos both take part in the International Baroque Music Festival every two years in Bolivia.

Climate
Trinidad, located at the southern edge of the Amazon basin on the Llanos de Moxos, is hot and humid most of the year. This region of the country is heavily forested and many large rivers (all tributaries of the Amazon river) run through Beni. Like most cities in Bolivia, it is built around a central plaza with a large Catholic cathedral as its centerpiece. Trinidad was originally a small Jesuit town but is now a large city with over 100,000 inhabitants. Its mission-style church was demolished and rebuilt in 1923. Despite these changes, many of the original religious relics, paintings and statues are still housed in the cathedral, which faces the main plaza.

Under the Köppen climate classification, Trinidad has a tropical monsoon climate bordering on a tropical savanna climate with a lengthy rainy season and a short dry season. The area receives ample rainfall, but is divided sharply between wet and dry seasons. Trinidad is technically Bolivia's wettest departmental capital, with more than 1,400mm in precipitation falling than in the capita La Paz (600mm).

Tourist attractions 

Trinidad has two singular museums. The Museo Itícola (Fish Fauna Museum) is the third largest of its kind in South America and houses over 400 specimens of fish species found in the region’s lakes and lagoons. It is located on the UAB University campus. Visitors can see tiny fish, piranhas, and a preserved pink river dolphin (full sized floating in formaldehyde). The Kenneth Lee Ethno-Archeological Museum is also a great place to visit. Here, visitors can view exhibits of pottery, utensils and tools, textiles and other implements used by the Moxos culture.

Of interest to ornithologists, the highly endangered blue-throated macaw (Ara glaucogularis) in the surrounding countryside. Expeditions to see these can be locally arranged.

Transportation 
Airport:  Teniente Jorge Henrich Arauz
Lat: 14° 48' 0 S
Lon: 64° 46' 0 W
Alt: 509 feet (155 metres)

Gallery

References

External links

 Weather in Trinidad
 Bolivian Yellow Pages
 Trinidad
 

 
Populated places in Beni Department
Populated places established in 1686
1686 establishments in the Spanish Empire
Jesuit Missions of Moxos